Nelson House may refer to:

Canada 

Nelson House, Manitoba

United Kingdom 
Nelson House, London, Grade II* listed house

United States 
(by state then city or town)

Nelson House (Latham, Alabama), listed on the National Register of Historic Places (NRHP) in Baldwin County, Alabama
Nelson House (Helena-West Helena, Arkansas), NRHP-listed in Phillips County
Nelson Ranch, Woodland, California, NRHP-listed in Yolo County
John B. Nelson House, Port Penn, Delaware, NRHP-listed
Wilhelmina Nelson House and Cabins, St. Charles, Idaho, NRHP-listed in Bear Lake County
Daniel Nelson House and Barn, Oskaloosa, Iowa, NRHP-listed in Mahaska County
F. P. Nelson House, Greencastle, Indiana, NRHP-listed in Putnam County
Pollard-Nelson House, Logansport, Indiana, NRHP-listed in Cass County
Nelson House (Lake Providence, Louisiana), NRHP-listed in East Carroll Parish
Nelson Homestead, Crisfield, Maryland, NRHP-listed
Nelson-Reardon-Kennard House, Abingdon, Maryland, NRHP-listed
Henry Nelson House, New Market, Maryland, NRHP-listed
Christina Nelson Three-Decker, Worcester, Massachusetts, NRHP-listed
John R. Nelson House, Quincy, Massachusetts, NRHP-listed
Knute Nelson House, Alexandria, Minnesota, listed on the NRHP in Minnesota
Perry Nelson House, West Concord, Minnesota, NRHP-listed
John Nelson Site, Willows, Mississippi, listed on the NRHP in Mississippi
Nelson Tenement, Pascagoula, Mississippi, listed on the NRHP in Mississippi
John C. Nelson House, Pascagoula, Mississippi, listed on the NRHP in Mississippi
Thomas Nelson House (Boonville, Missouri), NRHP-listed
Nelson House (Washington Crossing, New Jersey), Washington Crossing State Park, NRHP-listed
Thomas Nelson House (Peekskill, New York), NRHP-listed
Luman Nelson House, Ravenna, Ohio, listed on the NRHP in Ohio
Carl E. Nelson House, Salem, Oregon, NRHP-listed
Otto W. and Ida L. Nelson House, Portland, Oregon, NRHP-listed
John H. Nelson House, Fallowfield, Pennsylvania, NRHP-listed
Maurice Nelson House, Rapid City, South Dakota, listed on the NRHP in South Dakota
Nelson-Kirby House, Germantown, Tennessee, listed on the NRHP in Tennessee
August M. and Mabel Jensen Nelson House, Sandy, Utah, listed on the NRHP in Utah
Nels A. Nelson House, Sandy, Utah, listed on the NRHP in Utah
Nelson-Beesley House, Salt Lake City, Utah, listed on the NRHP in Utah
Nelson House (Nordland, Washington), listed on the NRHP in Jefferson County, Washington
Charles F. Nelson House, Olalla, Washington, listed on the NRHP in Washington
Nelson Hall, Stevens Point, Wisconsin, listed on the NRHP in Wisconsin
Charles E. Nelson Sr. House, Waukesha, Wisconsin, listed on the NRHP in Waukesha County, Wisconsin

See also
John Nelson House (disambiguation)
Nelson Farm (disambiguation)